Acrocercops terminalina is a moth of the family Gracillariidae. It is known from South Africa, Namibia and Zimbabwe.

The larvae feed on Terminalia silozensis. They mine the leaves of their host plant. The mine has the form of a large, irregular, transparent, whitish blotch-mine with purely epidermal areas, with some yellowish discoloration along the margin.

References

terminalina
Lepidoptera of Namibia
Lepidoptera of South Africa
Lepidoptera of Zimbabwe
Moths of Sub-Saharan Africa
Moths described in 1961